The Tirupati–Machilipatnam Link Express is an Express train belonging to South Central Railway zone that runs between  and  in India. It is currently being operated with 17401/17402 train numbers on a daily basis.

Service

The 17401/Tirupati–Machilipatnam Link Express has an average speed of 48 km/hr and covers 467 km in 9h 50m. The 17402/Machilipatanam-Tirupati Link Express has an average speed of 48 km/hr and covers 467 km in 9h 50m.

Route and halts 

The important halts of the train are:

Coach composition

The train has standard ICF rakes with a max speed of 110 kmph. The train consists of 19 coaches:

 2 AC III Tier
 9 Sleeper coaches
 4 General Unreserved
 4 Seating cum Luggage Rake

Traction

Both trains are hauled by a Vijayawada Loco Shed based WAM-4P electric locomotive from Tirupati to Vijayawada. From Vijayawada train is hauled by a Guntakal Loco Shed-based WDM-3A diesel locomotive uptil Machilipatnam and vice versa.

See also 

 Tirupati railway station
 Machilipatnam railway station

Notes

References

External links 

 17401/Tirupati–Machilipatnam Link Express India Rail Info
 17402/Machilipatnam–Tirupati Link Express India Rail Info

Transport in Tirupati
Transport in Secunderabad
Express trains in India
Rail transport in Karnataka
Rail transport in Telangana